The King's Chamber Orchestra  is a professional chamber orchestra based in the United Kingdom.

Originally performing as a symphony orchestra, regular concerts as a chamber orchestra began in the 1990s to support the Christian charitable work of Youth With A Mission. Consequently, the orchestra's first series in the smaller format were given at YWAM's beautiful estate in Harpenden, Hertfordshire.

The KCO's members are distinguished musicians, committed Christians, and friends whom Gerard has gathered together while freelancing with some of the finest orchestras in the UK, and who "share an interest in breaking down traditional walls for the sake of reaching a new generation."  This is manifested in programmes that are diverse and unpredictable, including Teddy Concerts for younger children.  During the last twenty years KCO has broadcast, recorded, and performed in a variety of venues ranging from the Royal Albert Hall to a number of more local venues.

The KCO has recorded three CDs of music:

 Landscapes
 Romance
 Freedom and Peace
 String Heaven
 Christmas String Heaven
 Christmas String Heaven II (Lost in Love)
 Christmas String Heaven III (In the Secret Place)
 Christmas String Heaven IV  (Joy to the World)
 River

External links
Orchestra website

Musical groups established in 1985
English orchestras
1985 establishments in the United Kingdom